Udayavarthinayur is a village in the Udayarpalayam taluk of Ariyalur district, Tamil Nadu, India.

Demographics 

As per the 2011 census, Udayavarthinayur had a total population of 2392 with 1163 males and 1229 females.

References 

Villages in Ariyalur district